The 2010–11 season was East Stirlingshire Football Club's seventeenth consecutive season in the Scottish Football League Third Division since being relegated from the Second Division at the end of the 1993–94 season, following league reconstruction. The club also competed in the Scottish Cup, League Cup and Challenge Cup.

Team kit 
A change from the previous two seasons, the club reverted to its traditional black and white hoops. A change from all black shirts from. New kit manufacturers were also introduced as Prostar with Foxlane as the shirt sponsor.

Fixtures and results

Scottish Third Division

League table

Results summary

Results by round

Scottish Cup

Scottish League Cup

Scottish Challenge Cup

Footnotes
1.  The club ground-shared Ochilview Park, the home of local rivals Stenhousemuir.
2.  East Stirlingshire defeated Buckie Thistle 1–0 in the fourth round but were expelled due to fielding an ineligible player. Buckie Thistle qualified for the fifth round.

References

External links
 Official site

East Stirlingshire F.C. seasons
East Stirlingshire